The Washington State Cougars football program is the intercollegiate American football team for Washington State University, located in Pullman, Washington. The team competes at the NCAA Division I level in the FBS and is a member of the Pac-12 Conference (Pac-12). Known as the Cougars, the first football team was fielded in 1894.

The Cougars play home games on campus at Martin Stadium, which opened in 1972; the site dates back to 1892 as Soldier Field and was renamed Rogers Field ten years later. Its present seating capacity is 33,522. Their main rivals are the Washington Huskies; the teams historically end the regular season with the Apple Cup rivalry game in late November.

History

Early history (1894–1977)

Washington State's first head football coach was William Goodyear. That team played only two games in its inaugural season in 1894, posting a 1–1 record. The team's first win was over Idaho. The first paid head football coach was William L. Allen, who served as head coach in 1900 and 1902, posting an overall record of 6–3–1.

John R. Bender served as head football coach from 1906 to 1907 and 1912–1914, compiling a record of 21–12. William Henry Dietz was the Cougars' head football coach from 1915 to 1917, posting a stellar 17–2–1 record. Dietz's 1915 team defeated Brown in the Rose Bowl and finished with a 7–0 record. Dietz was inducted into the College Football Hall of Fame as a coach in 2012. Albert Exendine served as Washington State's head football coach from 1923 to 1925, posting a 6–13–4 overall record. Babe Hollingbery was the Cougars' head football coach for 17 seasons, posting a  record. His 93 wins are the most by any head football coach in Washington State football history. Hollingbery's 1930 team played in the Rose Bowl, a game they lost to Alabama. The Cougars didn't lose a single home game from 1926 to 1935. Among the Cougar greats Hollingbery coached were Mel Hein, Turk Edwards, and Mel Dressel. The Hollingbery Fieldhouse that serves many of Washington State's athletics teams, was named in his honor in 1963. He was inducted into the College Football Hall of Fame as a coach in 1979. Like many other college football programs, the Cougars did not field a team in 1943 or 1944, due to World War II. After the war ended, Phil Sarboe was hired away from Lincoln High School in Tacoma to return to his alma mater as the head coach. Sarboe's Cougars posted a  record in his five seasons.

Forest Evashevski took over as the head coach in late 1949. His 1951 team finished the season ranked No. 14 in the Coaches' Poll and No. 18 in the AP Poll. Evashevski was inducted into the College Football Hall of Fame as a coach in 2000. Assistant coach Al Kircher was promoted, but didn't enjoy as much success as his predecessor, going  in his four seasons as head coach. He was not retained after his contract expired. His best season was his second in 1965, when the WSU "Cardiac Kids" went 7–3; they defeated three Big Ten teams on the road, but lost to rivals Idaho and Washington. It was Clark's only winning season, as he failed to win more than three games in the other three. Clark was not retained after the end of his fourth season. His best season was 1972 at 7–4, which was his only winning season. Sweeney resigned shortly after the 1975 season, and was succeeded by Jackie Sherrill, the defensive coordinator at Pittsburgh, but he stayed for only one season. The Cougars were 3–8 in 1976, then Sherrill returned to Pitt as head coach. Warren Powers, an assistant from Nebraska, also stayed for just one season (1977), then returned to the Big Eight Conference as head coach at Missouri.

Jim Walden era (1978–1986)
Jim Walden was promoted to head coach following the departure of Powers. In nine seasons, Walden led the Cougars to one bowl appearance, the Holiday Bowl in 1981, a memorable loss to BYU. It was Washington State's first bowl in 51 years, since the 1931 Rose Bowl. (The Pac-8 did not allow a second bowl team until 1975.) Walden won Pacific-10 Coach of the Year honors in 1981 and 1983. Walden's final record at Washington State was 44–52–4. Players coached by Walden at WSU include Jack Thompson, Kerry Porter, Rueben Mayes, Ricky Turner, Ricky Reynolds, Paul Sorensen, Brian Forde, Lee Blakeney, Mark Rypien, Dan Lynch, Pat Beach, Keith Millard, Erik Howard, and Cedrick Brown. Walden left after the 1986 season for Iowa State in the Big Eight.

Dennis Erickson era (1987–1988)
When hired in early 1987, 39-year-old Dennis Erickson said it was his lifelong dream to become the head football coach of the Cougars. His contract was a five-year deal at an annual base salary of $70,000, with up to $30,000 from radio, television, and speaking obligations. Erickson was previously the head coach at Wyoming for one season, preceded by four on the Palouse at neighboring Idaho.

Erickson's Cougars posted a 3–7–1 record in his first season, but improved to 9–3 in 1988, capped with a victory in the Aloha Bowl, the Cougars' first bowl victory since January 1916.

Mike Price era (1989–2002)
Former Cougar player and assistant Mike Price returned to Pullman in 1989; he was previously the head coach for eight years at Weber State in Ogden, Utah. Price led the Cougars to unprecedented success, taking his 1997 and 2002 teams to the Rose Bowl, both times losing. The 1997 team was led by star quarterback Ryan Leaf, the second overall pick in the 1998 NFL Draft by the San Diego Chargers. Those teams finished ranked No. 9 and No. 10 in the Coaches' and AP Polls, respectively. It was during the 2002 season that Washington State received its highest ranking ever in the modern era in the AP Poll at No. 3. Price left after the Rose Bowl for Alabama, but was fired before ever coaching a game for the Crimson Tide, due to an off-the-field incident in the spring.

Bill Doba era (2003–2007)
Defensive coordinator Bill Doba was promoted to head coach following Price's departure. Things started out well in 2003, as they went 10–3 to finish ninth in both major polls. The Cougars slipped to 5–6 in 2004 and 4–7 in 2005.

Paul Wulff era (2008–2011)
Former Cougar center Paul Wulff was hired away from Eastern Washington in Cheney to succeed Doba. Wulff struggled mightily as the WSU head coach, failing to win more than four games in a single season.

Mike Leach era (2012–2019)

In November 2011, it was announced that Mike Leach would replace Wulff as head coach. Leach had previously spent ten seasons as head coach at Texas Tech. In 2012, the new coaching staff installed an Air raid offense; an exciting, up-tempo, pass-oriented offensive attack which led the Pac-12 Conference in passing offense. In his second season in 2013, Leach led Washington State to the New Mexico Bowl, the first bowl game for the Cougars in a decade. Leach received a two-year contract extension that November, after leading the Cougars to their best record since 2006.

In 2015, Leach guided the Washington State Cougars to their first bowl victory since the 2003 season. In that same year, the team also posted a 9–4 winning season and was ranked in the AP Poll, Coach's Poll, and College Football Playoff ranking. Leach was named the Pac-12's co-Coach of the Year, as well as the Associated Press Pac-12 Coach of the Year. After the season, his contract was extended through the 2020 season.

In 2016, sandwiched between a two-game losing streak to begin and three-game losing streak to end the season, the Cougars rode an eight-game winning streak to a place in the Holiday Bowl, but lost to Minnesota 17–12. They finished with a 7-2 Pac-12 record and overall record of 8–5 for 2016. Huge wins over Oregon and No. 15 Stanford contributed to the Cougars' best finish in Pac-12 conference play since the 2003 team went 6–2.

After the suicide of projected starting quarterback Tyler Hilinski in January 2018, graduate transfer Gardner Minshew from East Carolina was recruited by Leach to fill the void. Minshew and other veteran players, such as sixth-year linebacker Peyton Pelluer,  rallied the team in honor of their former teammate Hilinski and led Washington State to a memorable season for Cougar football fans. With a 28–26 win over No. 24 Iowa State in the Alamo Bowl, Washington State won eleven games for the first time in school history and finished the season 11–2.

Nick Rolovich era (2020–2021)

After the 2019 season, Mike Leach departed Washington State to accept the head coaching job at Mississippi State. Less than a week after Leach's departure, athletic director Pat Chun announced the hire of Hawaii head coach Nick Rolovich. On October 18, 2021, he was fired for refusing to receive the Covid-19 vaccination in compliance with Washington's state employee mandate. Rolovich originally signaled that he would receive the vaccination, but decided to file for a religious exemption. Rolovich was denied the exemption and terminated.  Rolovich subsequently filed a wrongful termination lawsuit against the university, Chun, and Washington Governor Jay Inslee.

Jake Dickert era (2022–present)
Following the firing of Nick Rolovich, defensive coordinator and linebackers coach Jake Dickert was named as acting head coach. Under Dickert's leadership, the Cougars fought to a 3–2 record, including a 40–13 victory over rival Washington in the 113th Apple Cup, snapping a seven-game losing streak in the rivalry. As a result, Dickert was hired as the permanent head coach on November 27. The team concluded the 2021 season with a record of 7–5, with a 6–3 mark in-conference, good for a second-place finish in the Pac-12 North. The team lost to the Central Michigan Chippewas in the Sun Bowl 24–21. The following season in 2022 would result in the same overall record of 7-5 but worse in conference play at 4-5. The Cougars would get an invite to the LA Bowl where they would lose to the 9-4 Fresno State Bulldogs 29-6 leaving them with a final record of 7-6 for the 2022 season.

Conference affiliations

Washington State has been a member of the following conferences.

 Independent (1894–1916)
 Pacific Coast Conference (1917, 1919–1958)
 Independent (1918) 
 Independent (1959–1961)
 Pac-12 Conference (1962–present)
 Athletic Association of Western Universities (1962–1967)
 Pacific-8 Conference (1968–1977)
 Pacific-10 Conference (1978–2010)
 Pac-12 Conference (2011–present)

Championships

National championships
No NCAA-designated "major selector" has selected a Washington State team as national champions. The university does not claim any national titles for football.

The 1915 WSC team was unbeaten and untied and gave up only 10 points on the season. They were invited to the Tournament East-West football game, now known as the 1916 Rose Bowl, where they defeated Brown University 14–0. This was the second Rose Bowl game, after the original in 1902, and the first in the now annual continuous series.

There was no contemporary system for determining a national champion in the early years of college football. NCAA-designated major selectors have retroactively variously named Cornell, Minnesota, Oklahoma, and Pittsburgh champions or co-champions for the 1915 college football season.

Rose Bowl referee Walter Eckersall, who also officiated a Cornell game that season, was quoted as saying "[WSC] is the equal of Cornell. There is not a better football team in the country." The Associated Press referred to the 1915 WSC team as "mythical national champions" when members of the team returned to Pullman for a 20th anniversary celebration in 1935. In 2014, Washington State Senate Resolution 8715 recognized the team as national champions on the season's 99th anniversary. The senate resolution was adopted with WSU head football coach Mike Leach in attendance.

Conference championships
Dating back to their days in the Pacific Coast Conference, Washington State won four conference titles.

^

Division championships

^

Bowl games

Washington State has made 18 bowl appearances, with a record of 8–10 through the 2021 season. The Cougars have played in four Rose Bowls  three Holiday Bowls  the Sun Bowl (2 wins), Alamo Bowl (2 wins), Aloha Bowl (1 win), Copper Bowl (1 win), New Mexico Bowl (1 loss), and LA Bowl (1 loss). Prior to the 1975 season, the Pac-8 allowed only bowl team, to the Rose Bowl.

From 2015 through 2018, the Cougars made four consecutive bowl appearances for the first time in program history, all under head coach Mike Leach.

Head coaches

Rivalries

Washington

Washington State has had a rivalry with Washington since first playing  years ago in 1900. The teams played for the "Governor's Trophy" from 1934 to 1961. The game was renamed the Apple Cup in 1962 because of Washington's national reputation as a major producer of apples. Since 2011, the game is commonly played on the Friday after Thanksgiving.

Idaho

The first game was played  in November 1894 and resulted in a win for Washington State. The series has been played intermittently since 1978, It was revived as an annual game for a full decade (1998–2007) and the Cougars won eight of the ten. Idaho returned to lower-level FCS play in 2018 but the teams continue to schedule games.

Northwest Championship

Washington State wins the so-called Northwest Championship by sweeping Oregon, Oregon State, and Washington. The four Pacific Northwest rivals began playing in a round-robin format in the 1903 season.

Individual accomplishments

Heisman Trophy voting
Eight Cougars have finished in the Top 10 of the Heisman Trophy voting. Ryan Leaf had the highest finish in the Heisman balloting in program history, at third in 1997.

Consensus All-America selections
There have been seven Washington State players named consensus All-Americans through the 2017 season. Cody O'Connell was named twice, making the all-time school total eight. Both Jason Hanson (1989) and Cody O'Connell (2016) were unanimous selections. Additionally,  Washington State has had 39 first team All-America selections through the 2017 season.

^

College Football Hall of Fame
Five players and three coaches from the program have been inducted into the College Football Hall of Fame.

Pro Football Hall of Fame
Two Cougars have been inducted into the Pro Football Hall of Fame.

Canadian Football Hall of Fame
Four Cougars have been inducted into the Canadian Football Hall of Fame.

Retired numbers

The Cougars have officially retired two numbers.

Special cases 
Those numbers are not officially retired, but have not been reissued to any player either.

Notes

FWAA Eddie Robinson Coach of the Year Award

The Eddie Robinson Coach of the Year Award is given annually to a college football coach by the Football Writers Association of America (FWAA). Mike Price is the first and only coach in the Washington State football program history to have received this distinguished award.

AFCA National Coach of the Year

The AFCA Coach of the Year Award is given annually to a college football coach by the American Football Coaches Association (AFCA). Mike Leach is the first and only coach in the Washington State football program history to have received this distinguished award.

Pac-12 Coach of the Year

Five Washington State football head coaches have received the annual award a total of eight times as the conference's Coach of the Year.

^

Notable players

 Hamza Abdullah
 Calvin Armstrong
 Ed Barker
 Kay Bell
 Drew Bledsoe
 Steve Broussard
 Cedrick Brown
 Deone Bucannon
 Michael Bumpus
 Hugh Campbell
 Gail Cogdill
 Joe Danelo
 Devard Darling
 Chad DeGrenier
 Charles Dillon
 Dan Doornink
 Chad Eaton
 Turk Edwards
 Jack Elway
 Luke Falk
 Mark Fields
 Jason Gesser
 Brandon Gibson
 Steve Gleason
 Ken Grandberry
 Connor Halliday
 Dick Hanley
 Jason Hanson
 Tim Harris
 Jerome Harrison
 James Hasty
 Mel Hein
 Jason Hill
 Tyler Hilinski
 Milford Hodge
 Al Hoptowit
 Porter Lainhart
 Ryan Leaf
 Mike Levenseller
 Keith Lincoln
 Rian Lindell
 Rien Long
 Dan Lynch
 Hercules Mata'afa
 Rueben Mayes
 Rob Meier
 Keith Millard
 Gardner Minshew
 Cody O'Connell
 Don Paul
 Anthony Prior
 George Reed
 Timm Rosenbach
 Mark Rypien
 Elmer Schwartz
 Raonall Smith
 Harland Svare
 Kitrick Taylor
 Jack Thompson
 Lamont Thompson
 Robbie Tobeck
 LaVern Torgeson
 Marcus Trufant
 Marquess Wilson
 Clancy Williams
 Eric Williams
 Jerry Williams
 Zack Williams
 Cory Withrow
 Logan Tago

List of Washington State Cougars in the NFL Draft

Past uniforms

Future opponents

Non-division conference opponents
Washington State plays each of the other 5 schools in the North Division annually and 4 of the 6 schools from the South Division. Each season, Washington State "misses" two schools from the South Division: either UCLA or USC and one of the four Arizona or Mountain schools. This cycle repeats after eight seasons.

Non-conference opponents
Announced schedules as of November 30, 2022.

References

External links

 
WSU Libraries: Football game programs – archive
WSU Libraries: Football game films – archive

 
American football teams established in 1893
1893 establishments in Washington (state)